Brian Levin-Stankevich is the former president of Westminster College (Utah).  He previously served as the chancellor of the University of Wisconsin-Eau Claire.

Personal life
He was raised in Buffalo, New York's Kaisertown district and spent over twenty years working as an academic and administrator before being named chancellor at UW-Eau Claire.   Stankevich received his master's and doctoral degrees from the University at Buffalo. He received his undergraduate degree from Hamilton College. In 1977, he was a Fulbright Scholar.  He has worked as both a teacher and administrator at several institutions including the University at Buffalo, Florida Atlantic University, and Eastern Washington University.  Stankevich is married and is the parent of twin sons.

References

Living people
People from Buffalo, New York
Heads of universities and colleges in the United States
Hamilton College (New York) alumni
University at Buffalo alumni
Year of birth missing (living people)